Grim Skunk is the debut album by Canadian rock group GrimSkunk released in 1994. Uncle Costa is featured on Martha and a video was made for Silverhead. The songs Don't Hide and Rooftop Killer are rerecorded and rearranged versions from the Fatal Illness days.

Track listing 
Silverhead
In Eight Years
Don't Hide
Mother Of Creation
Martha
Bach In The Moors Of Mars
Look at Yourself 
Watchful Elms
Autumn Flowers
Circle Square Triangle
Texas Cult Song
Le dernier jour
Rooftop Killer

References 
Bande à part profile

Music video:

 Silverhead

GrimSkunk albums
1994 albums
Indica Records albums